Sainte-Juliette (Languedocien: Senta Geleda) is a commune in the Tarn-et-Garonne department in the Occitanie region in southern France.

Geography
The Barguelonnette flows southwestward through the commune.

See also
Communes of the Tarn-et-Garonne department

References

Communes of Tarn-et-Garonne